Rhizogoniales is an order of mosses in the Bryopsida.

Description
Most of the taxa within the order are basal-branching pleurocarps.

Taxonomy
Three families are included in the order. These are the Rhizogoniaceae, Orthodontiaceae, and Aulacomniaceae.

References

 
Moss orders